The Basin Football Club is an Australian rules football club located in The Basin, Victoria. The club is affiliated in Division 2 of the Eastern Football League. The Basin Football Club has a tradition of local support and continues to be a powerhouse in Eastern Football League.

History

The club was formed in 1947 and in 1948 combined with the Colchester-Basin Cricket Club and commenced playing at Batterham Reserve. They played in the Croydon FL and later became a founding member of the Eastern Football League.

Premierships

1962, 1985, 1994, 2012

VFL/AFL players
 Angelo Petraglia - ,          
 John Holt -                       
 Jason Daniltchenko -         
 Liam Shiels -

References

External links
 
 Official Eastern Football League site

Eastern Football League (Australia) clubs
Australian rules football clubs established in 1947
1947 establishments in Australia
Sport in the City of Knox